Martin Beck (born 25 October 1933) is a German ice hockey player. He competed in the men's tournament at the 1956 Winter Olympics.

References

External links
 

1933 births
Living people
Olympic ice hockey players of Germany
Olympic ice hockey players of the United Team of Germany
Ice hockey players at the 1956 Winter Olympics
Sportspeople from Füssen